is a passenger railway station located in the city of Mito, Ibaraki Prefecture, Japan operated by the East Japan Railway Company (JR East).

Lines
Akatsuka Station is served by the Jōban Line and the Mito Line, and is located 109.3 km from the official starting point of the Jōban Line at Nippori Station.

Station layout
The station consists of one side platform and one island platform. The station building is elevated and above the platforms. The station has a Midori no Madoguchi staffed ticket office.

Platforms

History
Akatsuka Station was opened on 4 January 1894. The Ibaraki Kotsu Ibaraki Line operated from this station from 1926 to 1971. The station was absorbed into the JR East network upon the privatization of the Japanese National Railways (JNR) on 1 April 1987. A new station building was completed in 1999.

Passenger statistics
In fiscal 2019, the station was used by an average of 6354 passengers daily (boarding passengers only).

Surrounding area
 Akatsuka Post Office
 Ibaraki Prefectural Building

See also
 List of railway stations in Japan

References

External links

  Station information JR East Station Information 

Railway stations in Ibaraki Prefecture
Jōban Line
Railway stations in Japan opened in 1894
Mito, Ibaraki